Parevia methaemia is a moth of the subfamily Arctiinae first described by William Schaus in 1905. It is found in French Guiana.

References

Phaegopterina
Moths described in 1905